New Windsor, founded in 1865, is a suburb of Auckland, New Zealand.

History

In the early 20th century, the area was well known for market gardens. New Windsor developed as suburban housing in the 1950s and 1960s. During this time, the area was officially known as Avondale East. In 1984, the name New Windsor, previously only used as a colloquial name, was officially adopted as the name of the suburb.

Demographics

New Windsor had a population of 7,758 at the 2018 New Zealand census, an increase of 477 people (6.6%) since the 2013 census, and an increase of 663 people (9.3%) since the 2006 census. There were 2,145 households, comprising 3,960 males and 3,795 females, giving a sex ratio of 1.04 males per female, with 1,476 people (19.0%) aged under 15 years, 2,070 (26.7%) aged 15 to 29, 3,414 (44.0%) aged 30 to 64, and 798 (10.3%) aged 65 or older.

Ethnicities were 30.6% European/Pākehā, 7.4% Māori, 17.3% Pacific peoples, 51.2% Asian, and 4.5% other ethnicities. People may identify with more than one ethnicity.

The percentage of people born overseas was 51.8, compared with 27.1% nationally.

Although some people chose not to answer the census's question about religious affiliation, 33.5% had no religion, 32.4% were Christian, 0.3% had Māori religious beliefs, 15.2% were Hindu, 9.5% were Muslim, 1.9% were Buddhist and 2.0% had other religions.

Of those at least 15 years old, 1,881 (29.9%) people had a bachelor's or higher degree, and 819 (13.0%) people had no formal qualifications. 843 people (13.4%) earned over $70,000 compared to 17.2% nationally. The employment status of those at least 15 was that 3,105 (49.4%) people were employed full-time, 858 (13.7%) were part-time, and 309 (4.9%) were unemployed.

Education

The school was opened in 1954, originally as a private school by the Sisters of St Joseph of the Sacred Heart.

Both schools are coeducational. Rolls are as of 

Local secondary schools are Avondale College and Lynfield College.

References

External links
New Windsor School website
Photographs of New Windsor held in Auckland Libraries' heritage collections.

Suburbs of Auckland
Whau Local Board Area
West Auckland, New Zealand